Acanthobrama centisquama, also known as the long-spine bream or Orontes bream, is a species of freshwater fish in the family Cyprinidae. It is known from Syria and Turkey, and there restricted to Lake Amik and al-Gab Lake. Lake Amik has been drained, and this species has not been found here since the early 20th century, and may be extinct. There may be remnant populations present in Gölbaşı Lake, which is impacted by pollution and water abstraction.

References

centisquama
Fish described in 1843
Critically endangered animals
Taxonomy articles created by Polbot